Metro FM is a radio station in Nepal,established by Kathmandu Metropolitan City. It received its operating license on March 9, 1998, from the government. After receiving the license, the station began its test transmission on September 17, 1998. On September 18, 1999, the station began its official transmission.

Originally, the station began its transmission on 106.7 MHz. Currently, it is operating on 94.6 MHz using 500 watts transmitter.

Currently, the station is on-air from 5:30 AM till 10 PM. The station is located in city hall, Bhrikuti mandap, Kathmandu.

External link 
http://www.metrofm.org.np

References
 Kathmandu Metropolitan City
 Metro FM 94.6mhz Commemorative Issue, Year 10, Issue 43.
 Frequencies licensed in Kathmandu Valley (including Lalitpur & Bhaktapur)
http://www.facebook.com/MetroFm946

Kathmandu
Radio stations established in 1999
Radio stations in Nepal
1999 establishments in Nepal